Sanjay Vishwanath Bhegade alias Bala Bhegade is an Indian politician. He was elected to the Maharashtra Legislative Assembly from Maval, Maharashtra in the 2014 Maharashtra Legislative Assembly election as a member of the Bharatiya Janata Party. He was sworn as Minister of State for Labour, Environment, Relief and Rehabilitation, Earthquake Rehabilitation in Devendra Fadnavis cabinet in June 2019.

References

Living people
State cabinet ministers of Maharashtra
People from Talegaon
1976 births
Marathi politicians
Members of the Maharashtra Legislative Assembly
Bharatiya Janata Party politicians from Maharashtra